"I Want to Be Happy" is a song with music by Vincent Youmans and lyrics by Irving Caesar written for the 1925 musical No, No, Nanette.

Musical
The song is used several times throughout the musical as a running theme representing the attempts of various people to please others.

It is first sung by the character Jimmy to his ward Nanette.

Film appearances
1930 No, No, Nanette
1940 No, No, Nanette - sung by Anna Neagle and Richard Carlson
1950 Tea for Two - sung by Doris Day, and also sung by Doris Day and Gordon MacRae
1988 Torch Song Trilogy - performed by Benny Goodman and His Orchestra
1995 Stuart Saves His Family - performed by Tommy Dorsey & His Orchestra starring Warren Covington
1999 Entrapment - performed by Ted Heath and His Orchestra
2015 Joy - performed by Ella Fitzgerald and Chick Webb and His Orchestra

Recordings

“I Want to Be Happy” charted several times over thirteen years:

 Carl Fenton and His Orchestra (1924, Billy Jones, Ernest Hare, Wilfred Glenn, Elliot Shaw, vocal, peaking at #5 over three weeks)
 Vincent Lopez and His Orchestra (1925, seven weeks, two of them at #2)
 Jan Garber and His Orchestra (1925, 5 weeks, peaking at #5)
 Shannon Four composed of Charles Hart, Lewis James, Elliot Shaw, Wilfred Glenn (1925, one week, peaking at #13). In 1926 this group became the Revelers.
 Red Nichols (cornet) and Adrian Rollini (baritone sax) (1930, one week, peaking at #19)
 Benny Goodman and His Orchestra (1937, one week, peaking at #17).

Other recordings include:
 Ella Fitzgerald - recorded December 17, 1937 with Chick Webb and His Orchestra for Decca Records, catalog No. 15039A.
Glenn Miller and His Orchestra recorded the song in 1939 and released it as the b--side to their hit single "In the Mood".
 Lester Young, Nat King Cole and Buddy Rich recorded the song in 1946, which was released in 1953 on the Clef Records 10-inch LP The Lester Young Trio No.2
 Doris Day on the album Tea for Two (1950)
 Bing Crosby recorded the song in 1954 for use on his radio show and it was subsequently included in the box set The Bing Crosby CBS Radio Recordings (1954-56) issued by Mosaic Records (catalog MD7-245) in 2009. 
 Tony Bennett - included in his album Love Story (1971).
 Sammy Davis, Jr. included a version of the song on his 1972 album Sammy Davis Jr. Now.
 The Alan Baylock Jazz Orchestra released a recording of the song on their 2014 studio album Prime Time with Doc Severinsen.

Other Versions
Florence Henderson and Robert Reed performed the song during a medley on a 1977 episode of The Brady Bunch Variety Hour. 
The Amazing Bud Powell, Vol. 2
 A version of the song was sometimes used as the closing theme for The Goon Show

See also
List of 1920s jazz standards

References

1925 songs
1925 singles
1920s jazz standards
Songs with lyrics by Irving Caesar
Songs with music by Vincent Youmans